Skeleton Strings 2 is William Control's second acoustic album and is again a mixture of his own tracks and covers. It was released on Christmas Eve 2014, and, like the Skeleton Strings album, was download only. Pre-orders went live on December 12 through Control's website and came with a bonus video of Disconnecting performed acoustically.

Track listing

Trivia
 Love Will Tear Us Apart is a cover of a Joy Division track. 
 Enjoy The Silence is a cover of a Depeche Mode track. 
 Love Me Tender is a cover of an Elvis Presley track. 
 Subculture is a cover of New Order track. 
 The Fields of Athenry is an old Irish folk ballad. 
 Sunday Bloody Sunday is a cover of a U2 track.

References

2014 albums
Covers albums
William Control albums